Nerizza Garcia Presnede Naig-Miranda (born 7 September 1985), better known as Neri Naig, is a Filipino actress. She was discovered after joining Star Circle Quest, a reality show of ABS-CBN in search of new actors and actresses and landed as the 6th runner-up.

Career
Naig joined Star Circle Quest but was not able to bag the title. After an absence of several years, she is now staging a career comeback with the help of her manager, Boy Abunda. She has been featured in shows like SCQ Reload: OK Ako!Kilig Ako!, Ang Panday, Sana Manulit Muli, Ysabella and a vampire in Imortal.

Personal life
In 2014, Naig and Chito Miranda vocalist of the band Parokya ni Edgar married twice: in a civil ceremony on 13 December and in a formal wedding in Tagaytay the following day. In August 2015, Naig's pregnancy suffered from a miscarriage, which would have been her first child with Miranda. On 19 June 2016, Chito Miranda announced that Neri is pregnant again.

Sex video scandal 
On 3 August 2013, three sex video snippets of Chito Miranda having sex with three women on different occasions were shown on YouTube. The video snippets with the other two women were taken down the same day, but the video with Naig became popular in different blogs and social media sites. On his Twitter account, Miranda said his room was recently robbed. Among those stolen was his hard disk drive, where photo and video files were stored. On Parokya ni Edgar's Facebook page and on Miranda's Instagram page, Miranda expressed his sadness on the leaking of the private video. He also asked for forgiveness from both his and Naig's families.

A second, more graphic clip, which is 11 minutes and 20 seconds long, different from the first video that spread in August was uploaded Monday afternoon on a Facebook page.

In February 2016, the Cebu Regional Trial Court Branch 5 issues a warrant of arrest against Naig and Danilyn Nunga, her road manager who faced charges of libel (in accordance with the Cybercrime Prevention Act of 2012) due to posting of an Instagram photo of two complainants who maliciously portrayed as bogus sellers of a digital camera.

Filmography

Television

Movies

References

External links
 

Place of birth missing (living people)
Star Circle Quest participants
Star Magic
Living people
Filipino film actresses
People from Baguio
1985 births
Filipino television actresses